Seyyed Ramazan (also Romanized as Seyyed Ramaẕān; also known as Hāyeţ) is a village in Gheyzaniyeh Rural District, in the Central District of Ahvaz County, Khuzestan Province, Iran. At the 2006 census, its population was 146, in 26 families.

References 

Populated places in Ahvaz County